Indian Tales is a collection of connected short narratives written and illustrated by Jaime de Angulo, published by A. A. Wyn in 1953. The stories revolve around an anthropomorphic animal family traveling across California, and encountering various mythological figures, such as Old Man Coyote, Loon Woman, and various animal tribes who live as the indigenous peoples of California did in pre-European times. The book is an imaginative retelling of many of the folktales and myths collected by de Angulo as an erstwhile anthropologist. The stories are written to be of interest to younger readers, but are also read by adults. The books foreword is by Carl Carmer. The Indian Tales were originally read live on KPFA radio in 1949, and released as a recording. The book has been used as a text in California history classes. De Angulo writes in the foreword,

"When you find yourself searching for some mechanical explanation, if you don't know the answer, invent one. When you pick out some inconsistency or marvelous improbability, satisfy your curiosity like the old Indian folk: 'Well, that's the way they tell that story. I didn't make it up!'"

Reception
Poet Marianne Moore wrote, "I am charmed by the book — text and pictures. It is no effort, of course, to be pleased by the sure touch — stories and animal drawings that are poetry, innate, humor-born, and wise."

Publication history
Hill & Wang (1954), first paperback edition, reprinted numerous times through the next 40 years, by successive imprints Farrar, Straus and North Point Press
Heinemann (1954) (as Red Indian Tales)
Ballantine Books (1974), first mass market paperback edition, 
Heyday Books (2003) California Legacy Project edition,

References

Indian Tales, Jaime de Angulo. Hill & Wang, 1953

External links

Indian Tales at Macmillan Publishers website (publisher of Hill & Wang backlist)
Indian Tales at WorldCat.org

1953 short story collections
Trickster gods
Native American mythology of California